Bhikhi Sharif is a village and union council of Mandi Bahauddin District in the Punjab province of Pakistan.

The economy is largely agrarian and the main crops of the village are cereals, rice, and wheat.

References 

Union councils of Mandi Bahauddin District
Villages in Mandi Bahauddin District